Allen East Public Schools is a school district in Northwest Ohio. The school district has an open enrollment policy meaning that students outside the district can enroll in Allen East Local Schools, though Allen East primarily serves students who live in the villages of Harrod, and Lafayette in Allen County. The superintendent is Mel Rentschler.

Grades 9-12
Allen East High School

Grades 5-8
Allen East Middle School

Grades PK-4
Allen East Elementary School

External links
District Website

School districts in Ohio
School districts established in 1965
Education in Allen County, Ohio
1965 establishments in Ohio